Passport to Nowhere is a 1947 American short documentary film produced by Frederic Ullman Jr. as part of RKO Pictures' documentary series This Is America. Its subject was European refugees after World War II. It was nominated for an Academy Award for Best Documentary Short.

References

External links

1947 films
1940s short documentary films
1947 documentary films
American short documentary films
American black-and-white films
Black-and-white documentary films
RKO Pictures short films
1940s English-language films
1940s American films